The Sugar Intervention refers to the events in Cuba between 1917 and 1922, when the United States Marine Corps was stationed on the island.

Background
When conservative Cuban president Mario García Menocal was re-elected in November 1916, liberals began to question the circumstances behind his re-election. The controversy escalated into a military insurgency in the country, led by former president José Miguel Gómez and aided by Pino Guerra and Merito Acosta. The left-wing forces were mostly acting in Eastern Cuba, however, and were insufficient to overthrow the government. On February 12, the USS Paducah (PG-18) landed men, following a request for protection from American sugarcane plantation owners.

By March 1917, the liberal forces in Western Cuba were mostly dispersed, and in the east, they lost in the Battle of Caicaje, after which many leaders of the liberal movement were captured, including Gomez and his command. The liberals also failed to gain support of the United States. Therefore, the liberals tried to abandon their cause and to conclude peace agreements with the conservatives at the local level. Menocal offered amnesty to all rebels. Many liberal leaders had to emigrate.

In April 1917, Cuba declared war on Germany, and many liberals, who agreed with the move, decided to stop criticizing the government. However, this crisis in the Liberal party resulted in the dramatic increase in banditry and local insurgency, since the low-level military commanders were not in a position to negotiate with the government and had to remain in the field without any central command. Small units which counted twenty to thirty men each were particularly active in the eastern provinces, and the government had no capability to deal with them. At the same time, the social base of the insurgents broadened, due to the concentration of agriculture in big latifundias specializing on sugar. The peasants were basically becoming bankrupt.

In this situation, the US government decided that the insurgency represented a direct threat to the American property in the country. In addition, the general mood of the insurgents was anti-American. Indeed, attacks on American property occurred. The USA were also afraid that Germany could support the insurgents. Though the Cuban government issued multiple statements that it is capable of taking the situation under control, nothing happened. On May 14 the US State Department proposed that the troops should be transferred to Cuba. However they were ordered not to be involved outside of protecting U.S. property. This caused strong opposition from the Cuban government. Because of this, the US government reconsidered and delayed the intervention. In mid-May, Henry Morgan was sent as a special envoy to Cuba to study the situation. After having familiarized himself with the situation, Morgan advised the government to dispatch the troops immediately to suppress the bandits, adding that the 1918 sugar harvest was in danger of being destroyed if the intervention was delayed. 

In July 1917, the Menocal government suspended constitutional guarantees, which means that anyone could be detained for an indefinite period of time. Whereas the measure was claimed to be intended against German spies, in practice it started the company of selective pro-government terror. In early summer 1917, the Cuban government agreed to the arrival of American Marines. Even though both sides clearly recognized that the liberal revolt was over, they needed the intervention to protect the crops. Morgan suggested to justify the intervention as was needed to suppress the insurrection. The US authorities, however, were afraid that this justification would undermine national and international position of the Menocal government, and announced that the goal of the intervention was to support Cuba as an ally in World War I, and the sugar harvest as the major contribution of Cuba at the Allied side.

Intervention
On July 14, Menocal formally offered training camps in the province of Oriente to USA. The first contingent, consisting of under 1000 American Marines, came to Cuba in August 1917. Technically, the operation was not an intervention. Rather, the Cuban government formally invited the US army to train in a warm climate. As guests of the government, the US troops were obliged to stay in strict limits.

During the first year of arrival, the US Marines assumed responsibility for the objects of infrastructure related to sugar plantations. In October, they established a number of permanent camps. Already in November 1917, the presence of the troops caused anti-American protests. In December 1917, another thousand Marines arrived.

The troops performed patrols of the countryside to ensure that sugar plantations were safe. In addition, they collected intelligence data, tried to obtain general information and passed it to the United States, as well as to authorities in Havana. They were instructed to fully cooperate with local authorities, in order to minimize frictions in Cuban-American relations. The population generally remained hostile to the Marines. In 1918, partially as a result of the measures undertaken, Cuba produced a record sugar harvest.

By mid-1918, the disturbance in the countryside ceased, and the main threat to sugar production was coming from the protests in the cities, mostly in form of strikes, which in particular targeted infrastructure for shipping and production of sugar. These protest were particularly strong in 1918 and 1919, spreading over the whole country. The American authorities preferred to represent these protests as political and leftist, which would justify intervention according to the Platt Amendment, even though such intervention would contradict to the original 1917 agreement with the Cuban Government. In December 1918, an additional 1,120 Marines arrived to the Guantánamo naval base. Additional six thousands were ready to arrive. The field operations were modified accordingly, and Marines were now patrolling the cities.

Aftermath
The 3rd Marine Brigade was reinforced by the 1st Marines in November 1918, as the war ended in Europe, ensuring sugar production continued. However, by 6 January 1922, the only American presence in Cuba was at Guantanamo Bay.

See also
 First Occupation of Cuba (1898–1902)
 Second Occupation of Cuba (1906–1909)

References 

1910s in Cuba
Banana Wars
1920s in Cuba
History of sugar